Halima Nosirova or Halima Nasyrova (Khalima Nasyrova) was an Uzbek singer of Uzbek music. She also started her creative activities as a drama actress in 1927 and was a popular artist of the USSR.

Honours and awards 
 People's Artist of the USSR (1937)
 Stalin Prize (1942, 1951)

Publications 
 Солнце над Востоком. Записки актрисы. М., 1962. 
 Мен ўзбек қизиман. Т., 1968.

Literature 
 НАСЫ́РОВА ХАЛИМА́ // Большая Российская Энциклопедия
 Саидов А. Х. Насырова. Таш., 1974
 Юлдашбаева Т.А. Х. Насырова. Таш., 1971; она же. Певцы узбекского оперного театра. Таш., 1985
 Франк Е.В. Х. Насырова. М.; Л., 1950

References

External links
 Peoples' Artist of the Soviet Union Antonina Nezhdanova and Peoples' Artist of Uzbekistan Khalima Nasyrova
 Бахриддин Насриддинов (Bahriddin Nasriddinov, Honoured Cultural Worker of Uzbekistan). "ХАЛИМЫ СОЛОВЬИНОЕ ПЕНЬЕ" 

1913 births
Uzbeks
20th-century Uzbekistani women singers
20th-century Uzbekistani actresses
2003 deaths
People from Fergana Oblast
Soviet women singers
Fifth convocation members of the Supreme Soviet of the Soviet Union
Soviet women in politics
20th-century Uzbekistani women politicians
20th-century Uzbekistani politicians
People's Artists of the USSR
Recipients of the Order of Lenin